Julius Foust "June" Greene (June 25, 1899 – March 19, 1974) was a pinch hitter and pitcher in Major League Baseball. He played for the Philadelphia Phillies in 1928 and 1929.

External links

1899 births
1974 deaths
Major League Baseball pitchers
Philadelphia Phillies players
Portsmouth Truckers players
Baseball players from North Carolina
People from Randolph County, North Carolina
Dyersburg Forked Deers players
Dyersburg Deers players